Saint Landry may refer to:

Landry of Sées (Saint Landericus or Saint Landry)
Landry of Paris (Saint Landericus of Paris)
Landry of Metz (Saint Landericus of Soignies), see Abbo II of Metz
St. Landry Parish, Louisiana, United States
Saint Landry, Louisiana, United States

See also
Landry (disambiguation)